The 1984–85 Montreal Canadiens season was the team's 76th season of play.

Offseason
 July 1984: Patrick Roy signed his first NHL contract with the Montreal Canadiens. There was a clause that if he played in at least 40 games, he would receive a $5,000 bonus.

Regular season
After scoring only two goals in 19 games and unhappy with the amount of ice time he was receiving, Guy Lafleur decided to retire.
 October 24, 1984: Patrick Roy was sent down to the Granby Bisons without having played a regular season game.
 February 23, 1985: At the beginning of the third period, Patrick Roy made his NHL debut. Roy replaced Doug Soetaert and earned the first win of his career in a 6–4 win over the Winnipeg Jets. It was his only game this season but he would play 1275 more games until 2003.

Final standings

Schedule and results

Playoffs
 Adams Division Finals
The Quebec Nordiques and Montreal Canadiens battled in a seven-game series. Bitter rivals from the province of Quebec, the Nords shocked the Habs in 1982, only to see a fourth-place Montréal club upset Québec the year before. In the deciding Game 7 at the Montreal Forum, Peter Šťastný scored the game and series winning goal, giving Québec an improbable 3–2 overtime win and berth in the Wales Conference Finals.

Player statistics

Regular season
Scoring

Goaltending

Playoffs
Scoring

Goaltending

Awards and records
 Chris Chelios, runner-up, Calder Memorial Trophy
 Chris Chelios, NHL All-Rookie Team
 Steve Penney, NHL All-Rookie Team

Transactions

Draft picks

NHL Draft

Farm teams

See also
 1984–85 NHL season

References
 Canadiens on Hockey Database
 Canadiens on NHL Reference

Montreal Canadiens seasons
Montreal Canadiens season, 1984-85
Montreal
Adams Division champion seasons
Montreal Canadiens
Montreal Canadiens